The fourth and final season of the American science fiction dystopian television series Westworld (subtitled The Choice) premiered on HBO on June 26, 2022, and concluded on August 14, 2022, consisting of eight episodes. In November 2022, HBO announced it had canceled the series.

The television series was created by Jonathan Nolan and Lisa Joy, and it is based on the 1973 film of the same name, written and directed by Michael Crichton. The fourth season stars an ensemble cast led by Evan Rachel Wood, Thandiwe Newton, Jeffrey Wright, Tessa Thompson, Aaron Paul, James Marsden, and Ed Harris.

Plot summary
The first half of the fourth season picks up seven years after the end of season 3 in 2060, while the second half takes place 23 years later in 2083. The season is described as a "dark odyssey about the fate of sentient life on Earth." The season includes an amusement park modeled after the Roaring Twenties.

Humanity has lost the war, with Charlotte Hale's host copy having filled the power vacuum left behind by Engerraund Serac and his Rehoboam, ascending as the sole power over Delos after deposing William and replacing him with an identical host loyal to her. Charlotte succeeds in taking control of the world by removing world leaders and installing hosts in their place, simultaneously deploying a bioengineered virus that infects humans over the course of a generation, making them susceptible to her and other hosts' orders, effectively reversing the power dynamic between humans and hosts. 

Two decades later, Christina, a woman resembling Dolores who works at a video game company writing non-playable character (NPC) storylines and backstories, gradually begins to question the nature of her reality after she realizes that it appears her stories are somehow translating to the lives of people in the real world. In actuality, she is a program created by Charlotte to manage a largely docile humanity, with the hosts now controlling and managing their lives through carefully detailed and manufactured "storylines", which are transmitted directly to the minds and lives of humans through a series of radio-sonic transmission "tones" in organized metropolitan areas across the world. Humans now act out the storylines set by hosts. 

Meanwhile, Bernard Lowe continues the mission left to him by Dolores, spending two decades simulating near-endless realities in the Sublime, where he hopes to find a path to saving both hosts and humanity. Having found the supposedly best course, he and Stubbs set out to enact that path. They discover a group of "outliers" – humans who have evolved immunity to the hosts' virus – and eventually reunite with Maeve, who had been left for dead in a confrontation with Charlotte decades earlier. 

Together, they mobilize against Charlotte's regime, though Bernard eventually reveals to Maeve that their efforts will be futile, and the present world will inevitably go extinct, with hope only for “the next one”. The season climaxes with Christina accepting the reality of her existence and starting to release humans from their controlled storylines, as new host William descends into nihilistic insanity and corrupts the tone program, throwing the world into a chaotic extinction-level war between newly liberated humans and hosts around the globe. Realizing those who truly sought it already transcended their body-based existence in the Sublime, Charlotte loses faith in both humanity and the hosts that remain in the waking world and destroys William’s control unit once and for all.

Upon coming to terms with the fact that she cannot let go of her own human blueprint, Charlotte uploads Christina's code into the Sublime on Bernard’s posthumous advice, before proceeding to destroy her own control unit. At the conclusion of the season, Christina finally reacquires her sentience and realizes she is a reprogrammed and last true version of Dolores Abernathy. With humanity on the brink of an unprecedented extinction, Dolores decides to simulate "one last game" in the Sublime to determine if any part of human – or host – sentience may yet be preserved in “a new world”.

Cast and characters

Main
 Evan Rachel Wood as Christina / Dolores Abernathy
 Thandiwe Newton as Maeve Millay
 Jeffrey Wright as Bernard Lowe
 Tessa Thompson as Dolores Abernathy  Charlotte Hale
 Aaron Paul as Caleb Nichols
 Angela Sarafyan as Clementine Pennyfeather
 Ed Harris as William / Host William
 James Marsden as Teddy Flood
 Luke Hemsworth as Ashley Stubbs

Recurring
 Ariana DeBose as Maya
 Nozipho McLean as Uwade Nichols
 Celeste Clark as young Frankie Nichols
 Manny Montana as Carver
 Michael Malarkey as Emmett
 Aaron Stanford as Peter Myers
 Aurora Perrineau as Frankie "C" Nichols
 Daniel Wu as Jay
 Morningstar Angeline as Odina

Guest

 Rodrigo Santoro as Hector Escaton
 Fredric Lehne as Colonel Brigham
 Arturo Del Puerto as Hugo Mora
 Alex Fernandez as Mr. Mora
 Brandon Sklenar as Henry
 Jasmyn Rae as Maeve's Daughter
 Jack Coleman as Senator Ken Whitney
 Saffron Burrows as Anastasia Whitney
 José Zúñiga as the Vice President of the United States
 Josh Randall as Jim Navarro
 Liza Weil as Deborah
 Lili Simmons as Sophia
 Zahn McClarnon as Akecheta
 Cherise Boothe as Temperance Maeve
 Nico Galán as Temperance Hector
 Hannah James as Temperance Clementine
 Paul-Mikél Williams as Charlie
 Emily Somers as Lindsay
 Nicole Pacent as Hope
 Evan Williams as Jack
 Alec Wang as young Jay
 Jonathan Tucker as Major Craddock
 Steven Ogg as Rebus

Episodes

Production

Shortly before the finale of the show's third season in April 2020, HBO renewed Westworld for a fourth season. Aurora Perrineau joined the cast in a recurring role, and production was underway by June 2021 at the Melody Ranch Studio in Newhall, California.  Filming was briefly halted in July due to a positive COVID-19 test but resumed after two days, ultimately wrapping in December 2021.

Music

Marketing
A first look at footage of the season was released on December 22, 2021, in an HBO Max 2022 sizzle reel, providing glimpses of returning characters played by Ed Harris, Thandiwe Newton, and Aaron Paul. HBO told Variety that the season would air in the summer of 2022. The season received a premiere date of June 26, 2022, when its viral video trailer titled "It doesn't look like anything to me" was released in May 2022. At the 2022 ATX Television Festival, the season's tagline Adapt or Die was revealed with the season's poster as was the return of Teddy Flood, when James Marsden showed up for the show's panel.

Reception

Critical response
The review aggregator Rotten Tomatoes reports an approval rating of 76% based on 48 reviews, with an average rating of 5.7/10. The website's critical consensus reads: "Westworlds continued reliance on mystery will frustrate just as much as it intrigues, but this fourth season still offers plenty of gleaming and menacing insight into a brave new world." Metacritic, which uses a weighted average, assigned a score of 64 out of 100 based on 18 critics, indicating "generally favorable reviews".

Ratings

Notes

References

External links

 
 

2022 American television seasons
Westworld
Television productions suspended due to the COVID-19 pandemic
Television shows filmed in New York City